Analytical Thomism is a philosophical movement which promotes the interchange of ideas between the thought of Thomas Aquinas (including the philosophy carried on in relation to his thinking, called 'Thomism'), and modern analytic philosophy.  

Scottish philosopher John Haldane first coined the term in the early 1990s and has since been one of the movement's leading proponents. According to Haldane, "analytical Thomism involves the bringing into mutual relationship of the styles and preoccupations of recent English-speaking philosophy and the ideas and concerns shared by St Thomas and his followers".

History 19th century—World War
The modern revival of Aquinas's thought can be traced to the work of mid-19th Century thomists, such as Tommaso Maria Zigliara, Josef Kleutgen, Gaetano Sanseverino, and Giovanni Maria Cornoldi.  This movement received an enormous impetus by Pope Leo XIII's encyclical Aeterni Patris of 1879. In the first half of the twentieth century, Edouard Hugon, Réginald Garrigou-Lagrange, Étienne Gilson, and Jacques Maritain, among others, carried on Leo's call for a Thomist revival.  Gilson and Maritain in particular taught and lectured throughout Europe and North America, influencing a generation of English-speaking Catholic philosophers.  Some of the latter then began to harmonize Thomism with broader contemporary philosophical trends.  

Similarly, the Kraków Circle in Poland used mathematical logic in presenting Thomism, which the Circle judged to have "a structured body of propositions connected in meaning and subject matter, and linked by logical relations of compatibility and incompatibility, entailment, etc." The Circle has been said to be "the most significant expression of Catholic thought between the two World Wars".

Postwar philosophical reception of Aquinas
By the middle of the 20th century Aquinas's thought came into dialogue with the analytical tradition through the work of G. E. M. Anscombe, Peter Geach, and Anthony Kenny.  Anscombe was Ludwig Wittgenstein's student, and his successor at the University of Cambridge; she was married to Geach, himself an accomplished logician and philosopher of religion.  Geach had converted to Roman Catholicism while studying at Oxford, Anscombe had converted before she came up, and both were instructed in the Faith in Oxford by the Dominican Richard Kehoe, who received them both into the Church before they met one another.  Kenny, an erstwhile priest and former Catholic, became a prominent philosopher at the University of Oxford and an editor and executor of Wittgenstein's literary estate, and is still portrayed by some as a promoter of Aquinas (Paterson & Pugh, xiii-xxiii), though his denial of some basic Thomist doctrines (e.g. divine timelessness) casts doubt on this.  

Anscombe, and other Aristotelians such as Alasdair MacIntyre, Philippa Foot, Mortimer Adler, and John Finnis, can largely be credited with the revival of "virtue ethics" in analytic moral theory and "natural law theory" in jurisprudence.  Both movements draw significantly upon Aquinas.

Notable analytical Thomists
Philosophers and theologians working in the intersection of Thomism and analytic philosophy include:

See also  
 Józef Maria Bocheński (Cracow Circle Thomism)  
 Meta-ethics  
 Philosophy of religion
 Neo-scholasticism

References

Citations

Sources

 

 

 , reprinted in Edgar Morscher, Otto Neumaier, and Peter Simons (2011), Ein Philosoph mit "Bodenhaftung":  Zu Leben und Werk von Joseph M. Bocheński, Sankt Augustin:  Academia, pp. 61-79.

Further reading

 Alfred Freddoso, Two Roles for Catholic Philosophers 
 Brian J Shanley, OP, The Thomist Tradition (Dordrecht/Boston/London: Kluwer, 2002).
 Entries by Stephen Theron in Haldane (ed.) (1997) and Paterson & Pugh (eds.) (2006).
 Entries by Shanley and John Knasas in Paterson & Pugh (eds.) (2006).
 

 John C. Cahalan, Causal Realism: An Essay on Philosophical Method and the Foundations of Knowledge (Routledge, 1985)

  

 John Finnis, Aquinas: Moral, Political, and Legal Theory (Oxford, 1998).

 John Haldane (ed.), "Analytical Thomism" volume of Monist 80 (4) October, 1997.

 

 

 Anthony J Lisska,Aquinas's Theory of Natural Law: An Analytic Reconstruction (Oxford: New York, 1996).

 Pérez de Laborda, Miguel, "El tomismo analítico", Philosophica: Enciclopedia filosófica on line 2007 

 Bruce D. Marshall, Trinity and Truth (Cambridge: Cambridge University Press, 1999).

 Roger Pouivet, Après Wittgenstein, saint Thomas (PUF, 1997).

 T. Adam Van Wart, Neither Nature nor Grace: Aquinas, Barth, and Garrigou-Lagrange on the Epistemic Use of God's Effects (Washington, D.C.: Catholic University of America Press, 2020).

 

Philosophical schools and traditions